Alleyne v. United States, 570 U.S. 99 (2013), was a United States Supreme Court case that decided that, in line with Apprendi v. New Jersey (2000), all facts that increase a mandatory minimum sentence must be submitted to and found true by a jury (not merely determined to be true by a judge's discretion). The majority opinion was written by Justice Clarence Thomas, joined by Justices Ginsburg, Breyer, Sotomayor, and Kagan.

Summary of findings
In the original trial, the defendant (Alleyne) was convicted of using or carrying a firearm in a violent crime, which carried a mandatory minimum penalty of five years' imprisonment. However, the mandatory minimum would rise to seven years if the accused were found to have "brandished" the firearm during the crime, and to ten years if he had fired it. In the original trial, the judge (not the jury) determined that Alleyne had probably brandished the firearm during the robbery, which caused the mandatory minimum sentence to rise to seven years (which was the sentence imposed).

The Supreme Court found that the question of whether or not the accused had brandished his weapon during the robbery was not merely a "sentencing factor," which the judge could unilaterally decide, but an "ingredient of the offense," which must be assessed and decided upon by the jury. The Court also expressly overruled Harris v. United States (2002), which had reached a contrary ruling.

See also
List of United States Supreme Court cases, volume 570
Southern Union Co. v. United States (2012)
United States v. O'Brien (2010)

References

Further reading

External links
 

United States Supreme Court cases
United States Supreme Court cases of the Roberts Court
United States Sixth Amendment sentencing case law
United States Supreme Court decisions that overrule a prior Supreme Court decision
2013 in United States case law